Keith Christopher Whiley (born 3 October 1948) is a former multi-sport Paralympian from Great Britain and is the father of wheelchair tennis player Jordanne Whiley. In the 1984 Summer Paralympics he took part in athletics and shooting. He has the same disease as his daughter, osteogenesis imperfecta.

He won the bronze medal in Men's 100 m L3 1984 Summer Paralympics.

References

Paralympic athletes of Great Britain
Paralympic shooters of Great Britain
Athletes (track and field) at the 1984 Summer Paralympics
Shooters at the 1984 Summer Paralympics
Paralympic bronze medalists for Great Britain
Sportspeople from Birmingham, West Midlands
Living people
1948 births
Medalists at the 1984 Summer Paralympics
People with osteogenesis imperfecta
Paralympic medalists in athletics (track and field)
British male wheelchair racers